Victoria Hospital is a government run hospital affiliated with Bangalore Medical College now renamed Bangalore Medical College and Research Institute. It is the largest hospital in bangalore, India. Started by Shri Krishnaraja Wodeyar, the then Maharaja of Mysore in 1901, the hospital soon rose to be among the prominent hospitals in South India. Dr. Padmanabhan Palpu, a famous doctor and bacteriologist from Kerala was instrumental in setting up the hospital.

Health care facilities
Emergency services are available 24 hours including traumatology and emergency surgery in the Mahabodhi Burns and Casualty block with a 24-hour blood bank. The burns department housed in the same building is among the best in Karnataka and is managed by the Plastic Surgery department. A centralized laboratory modernized with a grant from Infosys provides 24-hour services. The outpatient department housed in the Sir Puttanna Chetty block has a pharmacy that supplies medicines free to poor patients. The main building houses the administrative offices and wards. The centenary building houses new wards and the nuclear medicine department with gamma camera and modern operation theatres. The radiology department is in the B.M. Srinivasaiah block. The E.N.T department is in the Venkateshwara Institute. A dharmashala on the hospital campus provides subsidized accommodation for patient's companions.

Departments

 Internal Medicine
 General Surgery
 Orthopedics
 E.N.T.
 Blood Bank
 Anaesthesia
 Radiodiagnosis: All special X-rays, ultrasound, CT scan, gamma camera for isotope scans
 Radiotherapy
 Skin and Cosmetology
 Neurology
 Neurosurgery
 Urology
 Nephrology with dialysis facilities (at Institute of Nephro Urology - present in the same campus)
 Plastic, Cosmetic and Reconstructive Microsurgery
 Surgical Gastroenterology
 Microbiology
 Pathology
 Biochemistry
 Forensic Medicine
 Physiotherapy
 Pulmonary Medicine
Geriatric Medicine
Sports Medicine

References

External links
Official Website
Adroit Healthcare IT Solutions

Hospital buildings completed in 1901
Teaching hospitals in India
Hospitals established in 1901
Hospitals in Bangalore
1901 establishments in India
20th-century architecture in India